Secrets & Lies is a 1996 drama film written and directed by Mike Leigh. Led by an ensemble cast consisting of many Leigh regulars, it stars Marianne Jean-Baptiste as Hortense, a well-educated black middle-class London optometrist, who was adopted as a baby and has chosen to trace her family history – and discovers that her birth mother, Cynthia, played by Brenda Blethyn, is a working-class white woman with a dysfunctional family. Claire Rushbrook co-stars as Cynthia's other daughter Roxanne, while Timothy Spall and Phyllis Logan portray Cynthia's brother and sister-in-law, who have secrets of their own affecting their everyday family life.

Critically acclaimed, the film won the 1996 Cannes Film Festival's Palme d'Or, as well as the Best Actress award for Blethyn. She also won the Golden Globe Award for Best Actress in a Motion Picture – Drama for her portrayal. At the 50th British Academy Film Awards (BAFTA), the film received seven nominations, winning both Best British Film and Best Original Screenplay. It also received five Oscar nominations at the 69th Academy Awards ceremony.

Plot
Hortense Cumberbatch, a black optometrist in London who was adopted as a child, has chosen to trace her family history after the death of her adoptive mother. Despite being warned by public officials about the troubles she could face by tracking down her birth mother, she continues her investigation and is surprised to learn that her birth mother is white.

The woman in question, Cynthia Purley, works in a cardboard box factory and lives in East London with her other daughter Roxanne, a street sweeper; the pair have a tense relationship. Cynthia's younger brother Maurice is a successful photographer who lives in the suburbs with his wife Monica. They also have domestic difficulties due to Monica's often distant temperament. Later scenes reveal that she suffers from depression over her inability to have children. Cynthia and Monica have never liked one another: Monica regards her sister-in-law as self-pitying and overly hysterical, while Cynthia deems Monica greedy and snobbish. For this reason, Maurice rarely sees Cynthia and Roxanne despite not living particularly far from them, but he and Monica both look forward to celebrating their niece's upcoming 21st birthday. When Maurice pays Cynthia a surprise visit, she breaks down in tears, berating her brother for his long absence. Before leaving, Maurice gives her money to pay for repairs on the house and tells her of his and Monica's wish to hold a barbecue for Roxanne's birthday.

Roxanne is revealed to have a boyfriend, Paul, whom Cynthia has never met. This leads to an argument between mother and daughter; Roxanne storms out, leaving Cynthia in tears. Shortly thereafter, Hortense rings Cynthia and starts to enquire about "baby Elizabeth Purley", who she says was born in 1968. Cynthia realises that Hortense is the daughter she gave up for adoption as a teenager and hangs up the phone in distress; persevering, Hortense rings Cynthia again and eventually manages to persuade her to meet her. When they come face to face, Cynthia, not expecting Hortense to be black, insists that a mistake has been made with the birth records. Hortense convinces Cynthia to look at some documents pertaining to Hortense's birth. Cynthia remains convinced that Hortense is not her daughter until, suddenly, she retrieves a memory and begins to cry, stating that she is ashamed. Hortense then asks who her father was, to which Cynthia replies, "You don't wanna know that, darling." The pair continue to converse, asking questions about one another's lives.

Soon Hortense and Cynthia have struck up a friendship; Cynthia, who is not in the habit of going out, suddenly finds herself doing so frequently, catching the attention of Roxanne, who is confused by her mother's secrecy. On one of their meetings, Cynthia mentions to Hortense Roxanne's birthday party. She later asks Maurice if she can bring a "mate from work" to the barbecue; when he says yes, she relays this information to Hortense, who, despite her reservations, agrees to attend and pose as Cynthia's colleague.

On the day of the birthday party Monica tries to be welcoming, but she and Cynthia make passive-aggressive comments to one another. During the barbecue Hortense evasively answers the many questions that are put to her by the other guests. The party moves inside due to rain. While Hortense is in the bathroom, Cynthia, who has become increasingly nervous, reveals that she is Hortense's mother. Roxanne dismisses this claim, assuming that she has had too much to drink, but when Monica inadvertently confirms it as true, she is furious and storms out of the house. Maurice attempts to pacify the situation by confronting Roxanne at a nearby bus stop, and he and Paul manage to convince her to hear her mother out. Meanwhile, Cynthia and Monica quarrel. Cynthia says that Monica should try bringing up a child on her own, to which Monica, though visibly upset, says nothing. When Roxanne, Maurice and Paul return, Cynthia explains matters: she fell pregnant at fifteen and was sent away by her father; after the adoption she never expected Hortense to seek her out. Cynthia proceeds to berate Monica, and Maurice, coming to the latter's defence, reveals that she is physically incapable of having children. He loses his temper, exhorting those present to "share [their] pain" instead of harbouring resentments. He praises Hortense for having the courage to seek the truth. Monica breaks down crying after her secret has been revealed, and Cynthia goes to comfort Monica and the two women hug each other as a sign of them starting to reconcile. Cynthia then explains that Roxanne's father was an American medical student vacationing in Benidorm whom she met at a pub. One morning, Cynthia awoke and he had gone. Hortense again enquires as to the identity of her father. Cynthia replies, "Don't break my heart, darling."

After a while things have calmed down and Hortense pays a visit to Cynthia and Roxanne at their home. When Hortense reveals that she always wanted a sister, Roxanne says that she would be happy to introduce Hortense as her half-sister notwithstanding the long explanations that it would entail.

Cast

Production

Development
Leigh was inspired by "people close to [him] who have had adoption-related experiences" to make a film about adoption. Speaking on the subject, he stated: "I wanted for years to make a film which explored this predicament in a fictitious way. I also wanted to make a film about the new generation of young black people who are moving on and getting away from the ghetto stereotypes. And these were jumping off points for a film which turns out to be an exploration of roots and identity."

Many Leigh regulars make cameo appearances in the film, most of whom serve as clients at Maurice's job, including Peter Wight as the father in a family group, Gary McDonald as a boxer, Alison Steadman as a dog owner, Liz Smith as a cat owner, Sheila Kelley as a fertile mother, Phil Davis as a man in a suit, Anthony O'Donnell as an uneasy man, Ruth Sheen as a laughing woman, and musician Mia Soteriou as a fiancée.

Secrets and Lies was partly filmed in Whitehouse Way, Southgate, London. As in all of Leigh's films, the performances were created through months of intensive improvisation: Leigh and the individual actors created the characters at length. The emotional scene in the cafe, in which Cynthia realises that she is indeed Hortense's mother, was filmed in a single uninterrupted take of just over seven minutes. It had been a common misunderstanding that Brenda Blethyn was not told before filming that Hortense was black, making her reaction in the scene more authentic. In a supplement on the Criterion Collection release of the film in March 2021, Leigh, in conversation with Gary Yershon, clarified the method of improvisation and realisation of the scene.

Reception

The film was released to critical acclaim; on review aggregator Rotten Tomatoes it has an approval rating of 96% based on 45 reviews, with an average rating of 8.7/10; the site's critical consensus is: "Secrets & Lies delves into social issues with delicate aplomb and across-the-board incredible acting, and stands as one of writer-director Mike Leigh's most powerful works". On Metacritic, the film holds a weighted average score of 91 out of 100 based on 27 reviews, indicating "universal acclaim".

Film critic Roger Ebert, writing for the Chicago Sun-Times gave Secrets & Lies four out of four stars. He wrote that "moment after moment, scene after scene, Secrets & Lies unfolds with the fascination of eavesdropping", and added: "[Leigh] finds a rhythm of life – not 'real life,' but real life as fashioned and shaped by all the art and skill his actors can bring to it – and slips into it, so that we are not particularly aware we're watching a film". He called the film "a flowering of his technique. It moves us on a human level, it keeps us guessing during scenes as unpredictable as life, and it shows us how ordinary people have a chance of somehow coping with their problems, which are rather ordinary, too". In 2009, he added the film to his Great Movies collection.

Edward Guthmann of the San Francisco Chronicle called the film Leigh's "best and most accessible work to date" and remarked that "everyone's had these family skirmishes and confrontations in their lives, and it's remarkable to see them recorded so accurately and painfully on film. Leigh's marvelous achievement is not only in capturing emotional clarity on film, but also in illustrating the ways in which families start to heal and find a certain bravery in their efforts". Similarly, Kenneth Turan from the Los Angeles Times ranked the film among the best of the 14 features Leigh had written and directed by then. He found that Secrets & Lies was "a piercingly honest, completely accessible piece of work that will go directly to the hearts of audiences who have never heard of him. If film means anything to you, if emotional truth is a quality you care about, this is an event that ought not be missed [...] Unforced, confident and completely involving, with exceptional acting aided by Dick Pope's unobtrusive camera work and John Gregory's telling editing, Secrets & Lies is filmmaking to savor".

The Washington Post author Desson Howe felt that the film incorporated all the "elements of humor, sweetness, cruelty and directness" of Leigh's previous films but dubbed Secrets & Lies "more emotional, tear-inducing and compassionate than its predecessors". He declared it "an extended, multilayered revelation, and you don't get the full, complex picture until the final scene". His colleague, Rita Kempley, called the film "a magnificent melodrama that draws both tears and laughter from the everyday give-and-take of seemingly ordinary souls". She noted that "Blethyn and Jean-Baptiste are a joy to behold in tandem, but Blethyn's endearing portrait is transcendent".

It is listed as the 40th best British film by the BFI.

The film grossed £1.7 million ($2.8 million) in the United Kingdom. It grossed $8.9 million in France and $13.4 million in the United States and Canada. It grossed $29 million in other international markets for a worldwide gross of over $54 million.

Accolades

Positive pickets
This film was the subject of "positive pickets" by the adult adoptee rights organisation Bastard Nation, which used it as a vehicle to raise awareness of sealed birth records in the United States and Canada.

Director Leigh and actress Blethyn met with Bastard Nation activists at a positive picket in Beverly Hills on 10 March 1997, where they were presented with Bastard Nation T-shirts.

See also
 BFI Top 100 British films

References

External links
 
 Secrets and Lies at BFI Screenonline
 
 
 
Secrets & Lies: Seen and Not Seen an essay by Ashley Clark at the Criterion Collection

1996 films
1996 drama films
Black British mass media
Black British films
British drama films
Films directed by Mike Leigh
Films about dysfunctional families
Social realism in film
Films featuring a Best Drama Actress Golden Globe-winning performance
Films set in London
Films shot in London
British independent films
1996 independent films
Independent Spirit Award for Best Foreign Film winners
Palme d'Or winners
Films about adoption
BAFTA winners (films)
Best British Film BAFTA Award winners
Films whose writer won the Best Original Screenplay BAFTA Award
Films about mother–daughter relationships
1990s English-language films
1990s British films